The jack of hearts is a playing card in the standard 52-card deck.

Jack of Hearts may also refer to:

 Jack of Hearts (Marvel Comics) (Jack Hart), a fictional superhero appearing in Marvel Comics
 Jack of Hearts, a member of the Royal Flush Gang in DC Comics
 Jack of Hearts (TV series), a 1999 six-part British television crime drama series
 Jack of Hearts (play), an Australian comedy play by David Williamson
 Jack of Hearts (1950 film), a 1950 Swedish film directed by Hasse Ekman
 Jack of Hearts (1986 film), a 1986 Canadian short film based on a story by Isabel Huggan
 Jack of Hearts (1999 film), a 1999 American film directed by Serge Rodnunsky and starring Nick Mancuso
 The Jack of Hearts, a 1919 American short Western film directed by B. Reeves Eason

See also

 Jack of the Red Hearts, a 2015 film
 "Lily, Rosemary and the Jack of Hearts", a song by Bob Dylan released on the 1975 album Blood on the Tracks
 or 

 Knave of Hearts (disambiguation)
 Jack of Clubs (disambiguation)
 Jack of Diamonds (disambiguation)
 Jack of Spades (disambiguation)
 Queen of Hearts (disambiguation)
 King of Hearts (disambiguation)
 Ace of Hearts (disambiguation)
 Jack Hart (disambiguation)